Sde Nahum (lit. Nahum Field) is a kibbutz in the Beit She'an Valley in northern Israel. Located around 4 km northwest of Beit She'an, it falls under the jurisdiction of Valley of Springs Regional Council.

History

The kibbutz was founded on 5 January 1937 by members of the Sadeh group from the Mikveh Israel agricultural school, as well as immigrants from Austria, Germany and Poland. It was the third kibbutz established as part of the tower and stockade settlement movement. Initially called "Kibbutz HaSadeh,"  it was later renamed in honour of Nahum Sokolov, a Hebrew writer and  Zionist leader.
Ruins of a 5th–6th century Byzantine church has been found in the kibbutz.

The nearby Palestinian village of Saffuriya had been almost emptied of its 4000 inhabitants in July 1948. By early January, 1949, about  500 villagers had filtered back, but "neighbouring settlements coveted Saffuriya lands". The "Northern Front" ordered their eviction, which was carried out the 7th of January 1949. The  Saffuriya  land was then distributed to its neighbouring Jewish settlements. 

In February 1949, 1,500 Dunams of  Saffuriya land  was given to Sde Nahum.

Economy
The main economic activity is agriculture but the kibbutz also has a factory for the manufacture of plastic materials and an elderly care facility.

Notable people

Arieh Warshel, Nobel Prize-winning chemist (2013) and professor at the University of Southern California was born in Sde Nahum in 1940

References

External links
Official website

Kibbutzim
Kibbutz Movement
Populated places established in 1937
Archaeological sites in Israel
Populated places in Northern District (Israel)
1937 establishments in Mandatory Palestine
Austrian-Jewish culture in Israel
German-Jewish culture in Israel
Polish-Jewish culture in Israel